Toreador was the name of two ships of the Royal Navy.

 , a requisitioned Great Western Railway passenger ferry.

Royal Navy ship names